Tears to Tiara is an anime series adapted from the PlayStation 3 remake of the same title developed and published by Aquaplus. Produced by White Fox and directed by Tomoki Kobayashi, the series was broadcast simultaneously in Japan and Asia on Chiba TV and Animax Asia respectively from April 5 to September 27, 2009, making it the first anime to have a new world record for the fastest broadcast outside Japan. Tears to Tiara is broadcast in Animax Asia with English subtitles in Singapore and other local languages subtitles in each market area of Asia.

The story is set in a world based on British, Celtic & Roman mythology during the Dark Ages. The series follows the adventures of demon lord Arawn, who has been resurrected since his death 1,000 years ago by Drwc, a priest from the Divine Empire. Offering a girl named Riannon, a descendant of the Elf King Pwyll as a sacrifice, Drwc plots to use Arawn's powers for world domination. However, Arawn refuses the sacrifice and kills Drwc instead, thwarting his plans. Grateful for saving her, she makes him her husband and Chief of her people, the Gael Tribe. Together with Arthur, Riannon's older brother and The tribe's First Warrior and Ogam, a wizard and an old friend of Arawn and the siblings, Arawn leads the tribe along with a group of warriors who follows them against the Empire who plans to destroy all those who oppose them.

Three pieces of theme music are used for the series. The opening theme, titled Free and Dream, performed by Suara. The two ending themes, "Blue sky, True sky" and "Weeping alone", are performed by Aira Yuhki. Eight DVD compilations of the series were released by Pony Canyon; the first was released on June 17, 2009 and the last was released on January 20, 2010, with the first two volumes containing four episodes and the remaining volumes containing three episodes. In November 2009, Sentai Filmworks announced they have licensed the series for North American release. The DVD compilations were initially released with English subtitles, and the DVD/Blu-ray compilations released in 2010 included an English-language dub.

Episode list

References
General

Specific

Tears to Tiara